The 1929–30 season was Real Madrid Club de Fútbol's 28th season in existence, and their 2nd consecutive season in the Primera División. The club also played in the Campeonato Regional Centro (Central Regional Championship) and the Copa del Rey.

First-team squad

Transfers

In

In

Friendlies

Competitions

Overview

La Liga

League table

Matches

Campeonato Regional Centro

League table

Matches

Copa del Rey

Notes

External links
Real Madrid History 

1929-1930
Spanish football clubs 1929–30 season